Dragonstomper is an Atari 2600 role-playing video game programmed by Stephen Landrum and published in 1982 by Starpath. It requires the Starpath Supercharger peripheral.

Dragonstomper follows the adventures of a dragon hunter who is given a quest by the king to defeat a dragon and reclaim a magical amulet that was stolen. The player makes his way over the countryside vanquishing various adversaries and gaining gold and experience. After achieving strength, the player enters a shop in an oppressed village where equipment can be purchased, soldiers hired, and special scrolls obtained to defeat the dragon in its lair. The final leg of the journey traverses into the dragon's lair where he must avoid a series of traps strewn throughout the cave and defeat the dragon.

Gameplay

During the first segment of the game ("The Wilderness"), the player's goal is to either collect enough money and valuables to bribe the town guard into letting him pass through, or to find an identity card that will grant him permission to do so freely.  Either way, the overworld is a vast open space littered with castles, huts, churches, and other areas that can be explored.

Every so often, a random battle will occur, heralded by the opening bars to the Dragnet theme.  The player and enemy take turns attacking one another until one or the other is dead; if the player-character expires (accompanied by a faster version of "Taps" being played), a simple hit of the Reset switch brings him back to life right where he lies, but with all of his collected gold lost and his Strength and Dexterity reset to their normal values.  Experience points do not exist in the game, although every so often, items such as staves, potions, or magic rings will be found in the spoils of battle, or inside of the aforementioned buildings.  These items have a random chance of either raising or lowering the player's Strength or Dexterity.

Monsters largely consist of animals, insects and arachnids of various types, as well as human occupations (Maniacs, Warriors, etc.)  Some fantasy-themed creatures, like slimes, also exist.  Equipment is only available in the form of an axe and a shield which can be found from various locations or monsters (churches often contain shields).  Once the bridge guard permits it, the player can advance into the Oppressed Village.

Three different stores are available to the player there — a Hospital, a Magic Shop, and an Item Store.  Items that are no longer needed from the Wilderness can be sold for extra gold to use to buy new, helpful tools.  Like the bridge guard before them, the three soldiers have to be bribed (either with gold, rubies or sapphires) to enlist with the player.  Furthermore, healing potions, spells to locate and circumvent traps inside the dragon's cave, and miscellaneous goods (like ropes and bow and arrows) are available for purchase.  Once prepared, the player can enter the Dragon's Cave, which is preceded by a few bars of "In the Hall of the Mountain King".

The Dragon's Cave is simply one long, narrow hallway lined by jagged rock protrusions, with no monsters to fight; the primary danger is traps.  Two varieties exist — poison darts which fly back and forth in one set line, and invisible floor panels which, when stepped on, trigger an unavoidable burst of flash damage.  These panels can be detected with a spell, while the darts can simply be run past.  Succeeding in navigating the cave's dangers will result in coming upon a pit in the floor which leads to the dragon himself.

The fight with the dragon alternates with the player-character and the dragon taking steps towards one another in turns.  If the player has recruited any of the soldiers, they march of their own accord up to the dragon to help serve as a distraction and occasionally dealing (and being dealt) damage.  With the aforementioned "Unlock" spell, it is still necessary to successfully get past the Dragon and reach the amulet in its secluded chamber; without this spell, defeating the dragon is the only key to victory.

Reception
Electronic Games in 1983 stated that Dragonstomper "is sure to appeal to all quest game fans", with "more scope for interesting action than" other games. AllGame awarded the game five out of five stars, calling it a "surprisingly deep and ambitious RPG" and "an epic (and woefully overlooked) title" The review went on to praise that the "wonder of Dragonstomper lies in the magnitude and variety of its environments, which provide a depth of gameplay usually reserved for home computer titles of this genre"

In November 2005, Ed Lin writing for Forbes named Dragonstomper as "the best title ever made in the history of U.S. videogaming" by a single person. Lin singled out the game's ingenuity, noting that "[t]here were multiple ways to solve problems. One could descend to the dragon's lair on a rope or simply jump down (and absorb some damage)."

References

External links
Dragonstomper at Atari Mania

Role-playing video games
Atari 2600 games
Atari 2600-only games
North America-exclusive video games
Starpath games
1982 video games
Video games developed in the United States